The 1989 Nebraska Cornhuskers football team represented the University of Nebraska–Lincoln in the 1989 NCAA Division I-A football season. The team was coached by Tom Osborne and played their home games in Memorial Stadium in Lincoln, Nebraska.

Schedule

Roster and coaching staff

Depth chart

Game summaries

Northern Illinois

Utah

Minnesota

Oregon State

Kansas State

Missouri

Oklahoma State

Iowa State

Colorado

Kansas

Oklahoma

Florida State

Rankings

Awards

NFL and pro players
The following Nebraska players who participated in the 1989 season later moved on to the next level and joined a professional or semi-pro team as draftees or free agents.

References

Nebraska
Nebraska Cornhuskers football seasons
Nebraska Cornhuskers football